is a railway station of the Misumi Line, operated by Kyushu Railway Company in Uki, Kumamoto, Japan.

Railway stations in Kumamoto Prefecture
Railway stations in Japan opened in 1959